Blasberg is a German surname. Notable people with the surname include:

Claudia Blasberg (born 1975), German rower
Derek Blasberg (born 1982), American journalist
Erica Blasberg (1984–2010),  American professional golfer
Kurt Blasberg (1902–1967), German soldier

German-language surnames